Evelyn Garcia is an American chef most known for competing on the television series Top Chef: Houston.

Early life 
Garcia was born and raised in Houston, in the U.S. state of Texas. Her parents are from El Salvador and Mexico.

Career 
According to Jade Yamazaki Stewart of Eater Seattle, Garcia is "known for her creative melding of Texas and Southeast Asian cuisines". She operates the restaurant Kin (also known as Kin HTX), and has also hosted pop-up dinners and workshops. Garcia has appeared on Chopped and was a runner-up on Top Chef: Houston.

Personal life 
Garcia lives in Houston.

See also 
 List of people from Houston
 List of Top Chef contestants

References

External links
 
 Kin HTX

Living people
American women chefs
American people of Mexican descent
American people of Salvadoran descent
Chefs from Texas
People from Houston
Top Chef contestants
Year of birth missing (living people)